Riverside is an unincorporated community in Kanawha County, West Virginia, United States.

The community most likely was named in reference to the nearby Kanawha River.

References

Unincorporated communities in Kanawha County, West Virginia
Unincorporated communities in West Virginia
Populated places on the Kanawha River